Fried Buzzard is a live album by jazz saxophonist Lou Donaldson recorded at the Bon Ton Club in Buffalo, NY for the Cadet label in 1965 but not released until 1970.

Reception
The album was awarded 3 stars in an Allmusic review.

Track listing
All compositions by Lou Donaldson except as indicated
 "Fried Buzzard" - 11:18  
 "Summertime" (George Gershwin, Ira Gershwin, DuBose Heyward) - 5:38  
 "Peck Time" - 3:10  
 "The Thang" - 8:11  
 "The Best Things in Life Are Free" (Lew Brown, Buddy DeSylva, Ray Henderson) - 6:02  
 "Wee" (Denzil Best) - 3:03
Recorded at the Bon Ton Club in Buffalo, New York on August 6 & 7, 1965.

Personnel
Lou Donaldson - alto saxophone
Bill Hardman - trumpet
Billy Gardner - organ
Warren Stephens - guitar
Leo Morris - drums

References

Lou Donaldson live albums
1965 live albums
Cadet Records live albums